The Mixed touch rugby tournament at the 2019 Pacific Games was held in Apia from 18 to 20 July 2019 at the St Joseph's Sports Field.

Participating teams
Six Pacific Games Associations qualified for this tournament.

  (14)
  (14)
  (14)
  (14) (Host)
  (14)
  (14)

Round robin

Day 1

Day 2

Finals
Semi final 1

Semi final 2

Playoffs
5th/6th playoff

Bronze medal match

Gold medal match

See also
 Touch rugby at the 2019 Pacific Games – Men's tournament
 Touch rugby at the 2019 Pacific Games – Women's tournament

References

Touch rugby at the 2019 Pacific Games